The Methodist Recorder is an independent weekly newspaper that examines events and current affairs within the Methodist community in Britain and worldwide. It has been published continuously since 1861, absorbing its major rivals the Watchman in 1883, the United Methodist in 1932 and the Methodist Times in 1937.

On 13 February 1992 the Recorder published its 7,000th edition and the following year published its first April Fools' Day joke, claiming that there would be a "complete standardisation of Methodist worship" which would require local preachers to wear a "uniform" and be trained in clowning and juggling.

In 2010 the Recorder revamped its design and began to be published in full-colour. Its circulation was estimated at 20,000.

Although not available online, the Recorder maintains a basic website offering subscription details and a brief outline of the newspaper's contents. A full archive in both bound copies and microfilm is available from the Methodist Studies Unit of the former Westminster College, Oxford, now part of Oxford Brookes University. Public access is free of charge (by prior appointment) and a small charge is made for reproduction.

See also
Methodist Church of Great Britain
Primitive Methodist Magazine
Wesleyan Methodist Magazine, originally the Arminian Magazine, founded by John Wesley

References

External links

Religious magazines published in the United Kingdom
Methodism in the United Kingdom
Newspapers established in 1861
Weekly newspapers published in the United Kingdom
1861 establishments in the United Kingdom